Shuichi Kato may refer to:

 Shuichi Kato (politician), Japanese politician
 Shūichi Katō (critic), Japanese critic and author